Toshiko at Mocambo (full title, Toshiko at Mocambo, The Historic Mocambo Session '54, Volume 3) was recorded by jazz pianist Toshiko Akiyoshi at the Mocambo club in Yokohama, Japan, in the summer of 1954.  All four tracks from this recording as well as additional tracks from the same all-night live session with and without Akiyoshi were released on the 3 CD Rockwell – Polydor / Universal album, The Complete Historic Mocambo Session '54 – including, reportedly, a performance of "It's Only a Paper Moon" with Akiyoshi attempting to fill in on bass.

Track listing
LP side A
"Fine and Dandy" (Swift, James) – 15:11
"Taking a Chance on Love" (Duke, Latouche, Fetter) – 8:52
LP side B
"Donna Lee" (Parker) – 9:41
"Air Conditioning" (Parker) – 15:32

Personnel
Toshiko Akiyoshi – piano
Sadao Watanabe – alto saxophone
Keiichiro Ebihara – alto saxophone ("Fine and Dandy")
Akira Miyazawa – tenor saxophone (except "Taking A Chance On Love")
Akitoshi  Igarashi – alto saxophone ("Taking A Chance On Love")
Gō Ueda – bass (except "Taking A Chance On Love")
Jun Shimizu – drums (except "Fine and Dandy")
Kanji Harada – drums ("Fine and Dandy")

References

Polydor MPF 1029 (LP)
Polydor POCJ 2624 (3 CD compilation / re-issue of Vol. 1-4)

External links
Rockwell Records (link)
AllMusic [ The Complete Historic Mocambo Session '54]

Toshiko Akiyoshi live albums
1954 live albums
Polydor Records live albums